The Pac-12 Conference Softball Pitcher of the Year is a college softball award given to the Pac-12 Conference's most outstanding pitcher. The award has been given annually since 1999. The conference was known as the Pacific-10 before becoming the Pac-12 in 2011.

Key

Winners

Winners by school

References

Awards established in 1987
Player
NCAA Division I softball conference players of the year